Acceptance Speech is the sixth studio album of South African Motswako and hip hop artist Hip Hop Pantsula, released under the CCP/EMI S.A. label in November 2007 in South Africa.

Track listing

References

2007 albums
Hip Hop Pantsula albums